Arifwala is a tehsil of Pakpattan District in the Punjab province of Pakistan.

Administration 
The tehsil of Arifwala is administratively subdivided into 30 Union Councils.

Demography 
Most of the population are farmers; about 75% of the population live in villages and only 25% live in the municipal urban area. But the trend is shifting with the increase of industrialization in the premises of Arifwala and people are moving to the urban area. Arifwala Tehsil covers an area of 295,146 acres (1195 km2) with a population of about 720,000. The urban area covers 457 acres (1.85 km2) and the agriculture area covers 1274 acres (3.18 km²). Punjabi is the native spoken language but Urdu is also widely used.

Notable people 
 Yumna Zaidi - actress

References

 Populated places in Pakpattan District
Pakpattan District
Tehsils of Punjab, Pakistan
Cities in Punjab (Pakistan)